The ploughfish (Gymnodraco acuticeps) is a species of Antarctic dragonfish native to the Southern Ocean around Antarctica. This species is the only known member of its genus.

Taxonomy
The ploughfish was first formally described in 1902 by the Belgian-born British ichthyologist George Albert Boulenger with the type locality given as Cape Adare in Antarctica, Boulenger placed this species in a new monotypic genus Gymnodraco, it is still the only known species in that genus. The genus name is a compound of gymnos which means "bare" or "naked", a reference to the almost complete lack of scales on the body, and draco meaning "dragon" and is a common suffix used for notothenioid fish names. The specific name acuticeps means "pointed head" an allusion to the strongly depressed head with its sharply pointed snout.

Description
The ploughfish has a naked body, the only scales being those on the two lateral lines with the middle lateral line only has perforated scales, which is depressed at the head and compressed towards the tail. The head is triangular in shape with a long, pointed snout. There is a strong ridge on the operculum which forms a spine with a hooked process at its rear end and there is another spine on the soboperclulum and the preoperculum is smooth. The jaws have canine-like teeth at the mandibular symphysis, with bands of small, slightly decurved conical teeth behind them. The lower jaw protrudes beyond the upper with its front canine-like teeth exposed. There are 27-30 soft rays in the dorsal fin and 23-26 in the anal fin. In alcohol the overall colour of the body is dark brown, becoming paler on the underside. The head is marked with small spots and the body with
dark blotches, although these may fade over time. The fins are dark brown to blackish and there is a patch of dark colour around the anus.

Distribution and habitat
The ploughfish is found in the Southern Ocean and has been recorded from the Antarctic Peninsula, South Shetland Islands and the continental shelf of Antarctica, it probably has a circum-Antarctic range. However, as yet, it has not been recorded from West Antarctica.

Biology
Studies of diet have found that off the South Shetland ISlands they ate only the krill species Euphasia superba but in McMurdo Sound their diet was more varied and included mostly fish, with amphipods being the next most important food type, then fish eggs and then polychaetes. The fish taken included Pleuragramma antarcticum, Pagothenia borchgrevinki and Trematomus nicolai.

References

Bathydraconidae
Monotypic fish genera
Fish of the Southern Ocean
Fish of Antarctica
Fish described in 1902
Taxa named by George Albert Boulenger